Cylindera foveolata is a species of ground beetle of the subfamily Cicindelinae. It is found throughout Southeast Asia.

References

foveolata
Beetles described in 1863
Beetles of Asia